Gabriel "Gabe" Threadgold (born November 10, 2000) is an American soccer player who plays as a midfielder for the Washington Huskies.

Career
Threadgold played with the Seattle Sounders FC academy, whilst also appearing for the club's USL Championship side Tacoma Defiance in 2018 and 2019.

After leaving the Sounders academy, Threadgold began playing college soccer at the University of Washington in 2019.

Career statistics

Club

Notes

References

External links
 

Association football midfielders
American soccer players
Tacoma Defiance players
USL Championship players
Soccer players from Washington (state)
2000 births
Living people
People from Tukwila, Washington
Washington Huskies men's soccer players